Charlotte Hope is an English actress. She first achieved recognition for her recurring role as Myranda in the third through fifth seasons of the HBO fantasy series Game of Thrones (2013–2016). Hope gained further prominence in the lead role of Catherine of Aragon on the Starz historical drama series The Spanish Princess (2019–2020), her first starring performance. In 2020, she appeared as a series regular on the second season of the ITV thriller Bancroft and the Netflix biographical drama The English Game. Outside television, Hope has appeared in the biographic romance film The Theory of Everything (2014) and the horror film The Nun (2018). She also voiced one of the playable characters in the action-adventure video game We Happy Few (2018).

Early life and education
Hope was born in Salisbury and grew up in Lower Daggons, a rural hamlet in the New Forest District of Hampshire. Her younger sister Emily is a member of the band Police Dog Hogan. Their father is a barrister and former jockey and their mother stayed at home, having previously worked in PR.

Hope attended boarding school. She first discovered acting through a drama class at school. She went on to study French and Spanish at the University of Oxford. Whilst there, she found an agent and began taking on theatre and commercial gigs. Upon graduation from Oxford, Hope spent a year in Paris training in acting at L'École Internationale de Théâtre Jacques Lecoq.

Career
Hope made her film debut as a factory worker in the 2012 musical Les Miserables.

In 2013, Hope began playing the role of Ramsay Bolton's sadistic lover, Myranda, in HBO's fantasy drama series Game of Thrones. She continued in the role until the character died during the fifth season and her body was found in the sixth-season premiere. In 2014, she guest starred in the first season of The Musketeers, playing the role of Charlotte Mellendorf. That same year, she appeared in the film The Theory of Everything, portraying Philippa Hawking, the younger sister of Stephen Hawking. In 2015, she had a leading role in the British gangster film North v South as Willow Clarke. That same year, Hope appeared in the music video "Beautiful to Me" by Olly Murs.

In 2016, Hope appeared in the biographical romantic drama A United Kingdom and the romantic thriller Allied. In 2017, she had a supporting role in the drama film Three Christs and in 2018, she co-starred in the horror film The Nun.

Hope has also done theatre work, including Broadway shows such as Buried Child where she played the role of Shelly in 2016. In 2017 she played the role of Zara in Almeida Theatre's Albion and in 2018 she played as Dr. Michaels' mother in The New Group's Good for Otto.

In March 2018, Hope was cast in the lead role of the Starz series The Spanish Princess, in which she plays Catherine of Aragon. The show is a follow up to The White Queen and The White Princess.

In January 2020, she appeared as Annabel Connors, a main character in Season 2 of Bancroft opposite Sarah Parish. Having worked with Danish director Birgitte Stærmouse on the first season of The Spanish Princess, the pair teamed up again for Netflix's miniseries The English Game, which also aired in 2020.

Filmography

Film

Television

Video games

Stage

References

External links
 
 

Living people
21st-century English actresses
Actresses from Hampshire
Actresses from Wiltshire
Alumni of the University of Oxford
English film actresses
English stage actresses
English television actresses
1991 births